The  is an era in the history of Japan from about 300 to 538 AD (the date of the introduction of Buddhism), following the Yayoi period. The Kofun and the subsequent Asuka periods are sometimes collectively called the Yamato period. This period is the earliest era of recorded history in Japan, but studies depend heavily on archaeology since the chronology of historical sources tends to be distorted. The word kofun is Japanese for the type of burial mound dating from this era.

It was a period of cultural import. Continuing from the Yayoi period, the Kofun period is characterized by influence from China and the Korean Peninsula; archaeologists consider it a shared culture across the southern Korean Peninsula, Kyūshū and Honshū. On the other hand, the most prosperous keyhole-shaped burial mounds in Japan during this period were approximately 5,000 in Japan from the middle of the 3rd century in the Yayoi period to the 7th century in the Asuka period, and many of them had huge tombs, but in the southern Korean Peninsula there were only 13 from the 5th century to the 6th century, and the tombs were small. Wall decorations and Japanese-style armor, which are characteristic of older Japanese burial mounds, were excavated from 5th century burial mounds in the southern Korean Peninsula. This shows that Japan and the southern Korean Peninsula influenced each other.

According to the Nihon Shoki, Buddhism and the Chinese writing system were introduced near the end of the period from Baekje. The Kofun period recorded Japan's earliest political centralization, when the Yamato clan rose to power in southwestern Japan, established the Imperial House, and helped control trade routes across the region.

Kofun tombs

Kofun (from Middle Chinese kú 古 "ancient" + bjun 墳 "burial mound") are burial mounds built for members of the ruling class from the 3rd to the 7th centuries in Japan, and the Kofun period takes its name from the distinctive earthen mounds. The mounds contained large stone burial chambers, and some are surrounded by moats.

Kofun have four basic shapes: round and square are the most common, followed by 'scallop-shell' and 'keyhole.' The keyhole tomb is a distinct style found only in Japan, with a square front and round back. Kofun range in size from several meters to over 400 meters long, and unglazed pottery figures (Haniwa) were often buried under a kofun's circumference.

Development

The oldest Japanese kofun is reportedly Hokenoyama Kofun in Sakurai, Nara, which dates to the late 3rd century. In the Makimuku district of Sakurai, later keyhole kofuns (Hashihaka Kofun, Shibuya Mukaiyama Kofun) were built during the early 4th century. The keyhole kofun spread from Yamato to Kawachi—with giant kofun, such as Daisenryō Kofun—and then throughout the country during the 5th century. Keyhole kofun disappeared later in the 6th century, probably because of the drastic reformation of the Yamato court; Nihon Shoki records the introduction of Buddhism at this time. The last two great kofun are the  Imashirozuka kofun in Osaka (currently believed by scholars to be the tomb of Emperor Keitai) and the  Iwatoyama kofun in Fukuoka, recorded in Fudoki of Chikugo as the tomb of Iwai (political archrival of Emperor Keitai). Kofun burial mounds on the island of Tanegashima and two very old Shinto shrines on the island of Yakushima suggest that these islands were the southern boundary of the Yamato state; it extended north to Tainai in the present-day Niigata Prefecture, where excavated mounds have been associated with a person closely linked to the Yamato kingdom.

Yamato court

Yamato rule is usually believed to have begun about 250 AD, and it is generally agreed that Yamato rulers had keyhole-kofun culture and hegemony in Yamato until the 4th century. Autonomy of local powers remained throughout the period, particularly in Kibi (the present-day Okayama Prefecture), Izumo (current Shimane Prefecture), Koshi (current Fukui and Niigata Prefecture), Kenu (northern Kantō), Chikushi (northern Kyūshū), and Hi (central Kyūshū). During the 6th century, the Yamato clans began to dominate the southern half of Japan. According to the Book of Song, Yamato relationships with China probably began in the late 4th century.

The Yamato polity, which emerged by the late 5th century, was distinguished by powerful clans (豪族, gōzoku). Each clan was headed by a patriarch (氏上, Uji-no-kami), who performed sacred rituals to the clan's kami (objects of worship) to ensure its long-term welfare. Clan members were the aristocracy, and the royal line which controlled the Yamato court was at its zenith. Clan leaders were awarded kabane, inherited titles denoting rank and political standing which replaced family names.

The Kofun period is called the Yamato period by some Western scholars, since this local chieftainship became the imperial dynasty at the end of the period. However, the Yamato clan ruled just one polity among others during the Kofun era. Japanese archaeologists emphasise that other regional chieftainships (such as Kibi) were in close contention for dominance in the first half of the Kofun period; Kibi's Tsukuriyama Kofun is Japan's fourth-largest.

The Yamato court exercised power over clans in Kyūshū and Honshū, bestowing titles (some hereditary) on clan chieftains. The Yamato name became synonymous with Japan as Yamato rulers suppressed other clans and acquired agricultural land. Based on Chinese models (including the adoption of the Chinese written language), they began to develop a central administration and an imperial court attended by subordinate clan chieftains with no permanent capital. Powerful clans were the Soga, Katsuragi, Heguri and Koze clans in the Yamato and Bizen Provinces and the Kibi clans in the Izumo Province. The Ōtomo and Mononobe clans were military leaders, and the Nakatomi and Inbe clans handled rituals. The Soga clan provided the government's chief minister, the Ōtomo and Mononobe clans provided secondary ministers, and provincial leaders were called kuni no miyatsuko. Craftsmen were organized into guilds.

Territorial expansion

In addition to archaeological findings indicating a local monarchy in Kibi Province as an important rival, the legend of the 4th-century Prince Yamato Takeru alludes to the borders of the Yamato and battlegrounds in the region; a frontier was near the later Izumo Province (eastern present-day Shimane Prefecture). Another frontier, in Kyūshū, was apparently north of present-day Kumamoto Prefecture. According to the legend, there was an eastern land in Honshū "whose people disobeyed the imperial court" and against whom Yamato Takeru was sent to fight. It is unclear if the rival country was near the Yamato nucleus or further away. Kai Province is mentioned as a location where prince Yamato Takeru traveled on his military expedition.

The period's northern frontier was explained in Kojiki as the legend of Shido Shōgun's (四道将軍, "Shōguns to four ways") expedition. One of four shōguns, Ōbiko set out northward to Koshi and his son Take Nunakawawake left for the eastern states. The father moved east from northern Koshi, and the son moved north; they met at Aizu, in present-day western Fukushima Prefecture. Although the legend is probably not factual, Aizu is near southern Tōhoku (the northern extent of late-4th-century keyhole-kofun culture).

Ōkimi

During the Kofun period, an aristocratic society with militaristic rulers developed. The period was a critical stage in Japan's evolution into a cohesive, recognized state. The society was most developed in the Kinai region and the eastern Setouchi region. Japan's rulers petitioned the Chinese court for confirmation of royal titles.

While the rulers' title was officially "King", they called themselves "Ōkimi" (大王, "Great King") during this period. Inscriptions on two swords (the Inariyama and Eta Funayama Swords) read Amenoshita Shiroshimesu (治天下; "ruling Heaven and Earth") and Ōkimi, indicating that the rulers invoked the Mandate of Heaven. The title Amenoshita Shiroshimesu Ōkimi was used until the 7th century, when it was replaced by Tennō.

Clans
Many of the clans and local chieftains who made up the Yamato polity claimed descent from the imperial family or kami. Archaeological evidence for the clans is found on the Inariyama Sword, on which the bearer recorded the names of his ancestors to claim descent from Ōbiko (大彦, recorded in the Nihon Shoki as a son of Emperor Kōgen). A number of clans claimed origin in China or the Korean Peninsula.

During the 5th century, the Katsuragi clan (葛城氏, descended from the legendary grandson of Emperor Kōgen) was the most prominent power in the court and intermarried with the imperial family. After the clan declined, late in the century, it was replaced by the Ōtomo clan. When Emperor Buretsu died with no apparent heir, Ōtomo no Kanamura recommended Emperor Keitai (a distant imperial relative in Koshi Province) as the new monarch. Kanamura resigned due to the failure of his diplomatic policies, and the court was controlled by the Mononobe and Soga clans at the beginning of the Asuka period.

Society

Toraijin

Toraijin refers to people who immigrated to Japan from abroad via the Ryukyu Islands or the Korean Peninsula. They introduced numerous, significant aspects of Chinese culture to Japan such as Chinese writing system and Buddhism from India. Valuing their knowledge and culture, the Yamato government gave preferential treatment to toraijin. According to the 815 book, Shinsen Shōjiroku, 317 of 1,182 clans in the Kinai region of Honshū were considered to have foreign ancestry. 163 were from China, 104 from Baekje ("Paekche" in the older romanization), 41 from Goguryeo, 6 from Silla, and 3 from Gaya. They may have immigrated to Japan between 356 and 645.

Chinese migration
According to the Shinsen Shōjiroku (used as a directory of aristocrats), Chinese immigrants had considerable influence. The Yamato imperial court edited the directory in 815, listing 163 Chinese clans.

According to Nihon Shoki, the Hata clan (descendants of Qin Shi Huang) arrived in Yamato in 403 (the fourteenth year of Ōjin) as the vanguard of 120 provinces. According to the Shinsen Shōjiroku, the Hata clan were dispersed throughout a number of provinces during the reign of Emperor Nintoku and forced to practice sericulture and silk manufacturing for the court. When the finance ministry was set up in the Yamato court, Hata no Otsuchichi became chief of several departments (伴造) and was appointed Ministry of the Treasury (大蔵省; Okura no jo); the heads of the family were apparently financial officials of the court.

According to the Shinsen Shōjiroku, Achi received permission to establish the province of Imaki. The Kawachi-no-Fumi clan, descendants of Gaozu of Han, introduced elements of Chinese writing to the Yamato court.

The  is descended from Cao Cao. Takamuko no Kuromaro observed the Taika Reforms.

Korean migration
Some of the many Korean immigrants who settled in Japan beginning in the 4th century were the progenitors of Japanese clans. According to Kojiki and Nihon Shoki, the oldest record of a Silla immigrant is Amenohiboko: a legendary prince of Silla who settled in Japan at the era of Emperor Suinin, possibly during the 3rd or 4th centuries.

Baekje and Silla sent their princes as hostages to the Yamato court in exchange for military support. King Muryeong of Baekje was born in Kyushu (筑紫) of Japan as the child of a hostage in 462, and left a son in Japan who was an ancestor of the minor-noble  clan. In 2001, Emperor Akihito confirmed his ancient royal Korean heritage through Emperor Kanmu.

Culture

Language

Chinese, Japanese, and Koreans  wrote historical accounts primarily in Chinese characters, making original pronunciation difficult to trace. Although writing was largely unknown to the indigenous Japanese of the period, the literary skills of foreigners seem to have been increasingly appreciated by the Japanese elite. The Inariyama Sword, tentatively dated to 471 or 531, contains Chinese-character inscriptions in a style used in China at the time.

Haniwa
The cavalry wore armour, carried swords and other weapons, and used advanced military methods similar to those of Northeast Asia. The most important of these haniwa were found in southern Honshū (especially the Kinai region around Nara Prefecture) and northern Kyūshū. Haniwa grave offerings were sculpted as horses, chickens, birds, fans, fish, houses, weapons, shields, sunshades, pillows, and male and female humans.

Introduction of material culture
Much of the material culture of the Kofun period demonstrates that Japan was in close political and economic contact with continental Asia (especially with the southern dynasties of China) via the Korean Peninsula; bronze mirrors cast from the same mould have been found on both sides of the Tsushima Strait. Irrigation, sericulture, and weaving were brought to Japan by Chinese immigrants, who are mentioned in ancient Japanese histories; the Chinese Hata clan  introduced sericulture and certain types of weaving.

Asuka period
The introduction of Buddhism in 538 marked the transition from the Kofun to the Asuka period, which coincided with the reunification of China under the Sui dynasty later in the century. Japan became deeply influenced by Chinese culture, adding a cultural context to the religious distinction between the periods.

Relations with other East Asian kingdoms

Chinese records
According to the Book of Sui, Silla and Baekje greatly valued relations with the Kofun-period Wa and the Korean kingdoms made diplomatic efforts to maintain their good standing with the Japanese. The Book of Song reported that a Chinese emperor appointed the five kings of Wa in 451 to supervise military Affairs of Wa, Silla, Imna, Gara, Jinhan and Mahan.

Japanese records
According to the Nihon Shoki, Silla was conquered by the Japanese Empress-consort Jingū in the third century. However, due to lack of evidence, this story is considered to be mythological in nature. It reported that the prince of Silla came to Japan to serve the emperor of Japan, and lived in Tajima Province. Known as Amenohiboko, his descendant is Tajima Mori. According to Kojiki and Nihon Shoki, Geunchogo of Baekje presented stallions, broodmares and trainers to the Japanese emperor during Emperor Ōjin's reign.

According to Kojiki and Nihon Shoki, Baekje had also sent a scholar by the name of Wani during the reign of Emperor Ōjin. He is said to be the pioneer of the introduction of the Chinese writing system to Japan.

Korean records
The Samguk sagi (Chronicles of the Three Kingdoms) reported that Baekje and Silla sent their princes as hostages to the Yamato court in exchange for military support to continue their military campaigns; King Asin of Baekje sent his son (Jeonji) in 397, and King Silseong of Silla sent his son Misaheun in 402. Hogong, from Japan, helped to found Silla.

Genetics 
In mid 2021, The Nikkei published a new finding of the genetic makeup of modern Japanese and found much of Japanese make-up could be divided into two major groups, one being "Jomon" and the other being "Toraijin", a group of people who entered Japan following the Jomon people. Jun Ohashi, the lead researcher and professor at Tokyo University, explained that 50 people's genetic samples were collected from each prefecture from a total of 47.

The study explained that the Toraijin, who entered the Japanese archipelago from the southern Korean peninsula after the Yayoi people (who used the same route) were concentrated in a specific region of Japan contrary to popular belief. The researchers were intrigued that the genomes found in Kinki, Hokuriku and Shikoku regions were mostly made up of Toraijin while the rest were mostly composed of Jomon strands. Professor Ohashi said "In northern Kyushu, the population of migrants did not increase much even after landing, but rather the population expanded in areas such as Shikoku and Kinki."

Archaeological sites in Aichi Prefecture have revealed that Jomon people and Toraijin coexisted for a long time throughout the Yayoi period. The differences between prefectures that remain in the modern Japanese archipelago as seen in this analysis may reflect events that no one knows yet that occurred in the process of mixed races during the Yayoi period.

In late 2021, research from a study published in the journal Science Advances conducted by a team of Japanese and Irish researchers at Trinity College Dublin found that the people of Japan bore genetic signatures from three ancient populations rather than just two as previously thought. Researchers had been learning about the three ancient cultures of Japan as more artifacts showed up but knew relatively little about the genetic origins and impact of the transitional periods.

The first was Japan's indigenous culture of hunter-gatherers called the Jomon. These indigenous people had their own unique lifestyle and culture within Japan for thousands of years. The second cluster was a population of Northeast Asian origins, associated with the Yayoi period migration. This group is thought to have marked the arrival of paddy field rice cultivation which led to an agricultural revolution in the archipelago until the following period.

According to the research, modern Japanese possess approximately 13% and 16% genetic ancestry from the first two groups, respectively, while the remaining 71% come from the migrants of the Kofun period.
These migrants appear to have had genetic makeup similar to ancient people who lived along the Yellow River in China, mainly resembling the Han Chinese who make up most of China's population. According to Shigeki Nakagome, co-leader of the study, this migrant group was said to have brought cultural advances and centralized leadership to Japan. "Han are genetically close to ancient Chinese people from the Yellow River or West Liao River, as well as modern populations, including the Tujia, She and Miao," Nakagome said. "We think these immigrants came from somewhere around these regions."

Strong cultural and political affinity between Japan, Korea and China is also observable from several imports, including Chinese mirrors and coins, Korean raw materials for iron production, and Chinese characters inscribed on metal implements. Several lines of archaeological evidence support the introduction of new large settlements to Japan, most likely from the southern Korean peninsula, during the Yayoi-Kofun cultural transition which could reflect the general route taken by the Kofun people. However, a study that examines the genetic relationship between ancient Korea and the Kofun period is yet to be made.

The researchers noted that ancestral heterogeneity exists across Japan today, which is not fully captured by this standard reference set. They also stated that with the limited resources they had as only three Kofun skeletons were available for examination, there are still many more questions that need to be answered. "The Kofun individuals sequenced were not buried in keyhole-shaped mounds [reserved for high-ranking individuals], which implies that they were lower-ranking people," Nakagome said. "To see if this East Asian ancestry played a key role in the transition, we need to sequence people with a higher rank."

The study is known to be the most comprehensive analysis of the Japanese archipelago published to date. Daniel G. Bradley, co-leader the research project, said, "Our insights into the complex origins of modern-day Japanese once again shows the power of ancient genomics to uncover new information about human prehistory that could not be seen otherwise."

Takashi Gakuhari, a researcher conducting the experiment and a professor at Kanazawa University, explained in an interview with Ishikawa TV that mostly 40% of modern Japanese genetic ancestry was found to come from migrants that arrived during the Kofun period, somewhat contradicting the aforementioned study. However, he remained confident that the Kofun strand played a large factor in Japanese genetics today.

Following the publication, an interview with the research team by the Asahi Shimbun was conducted and the team explained that only three human remains of Kofun people excavated in Kanazawa City were used to study the genes of Kofun people and that it is necessary to study the genes of many other human remains in order to conclude the new theory.
Takashi Gakuhari said that this is the first study to provide evidence that the Japanese consist of three ancestral groups: Jomon, Yayoi, and Kofun. He also said he would like to continue to study the mysterious origin of the Japanese people by examining the genomes of other ancient burial sites.

Kenichi Shinoda, director of the National Museum of Nature and Science, added that the genetic information of the Yayoi people varies by region and time period with examples similar to that of modern Japanese people. In order to clarify the results, he said it is necessary to increase the number of human bones to be analyzed.

Results of the Japan-South Korea Joint Historical Research 
Under an agreement reached at the 2001 Japan-South Korea summit, Japanese and South Korean historians conducted joint historical research in two phases, including the relationship between Japan and the Korean Peninsula during the Kofun period. The point at issue was the "Mimana Nihon-fu" (任那日本府) which was said to be the governing institution Japan established in Korea at that time. After the controversy, Japanese and South Korean historians agreed that there were Japanese in the south of Korea and that the term "Mimana Nihon-fu" was not used at the time and should not be used as it was misleading. However, they could not agree on the position of the Japanese people in Korea at that time. The Japanese side claimed that the institutions established in Korea by the Japanese people were not under the control of Koreans, but were operated independently by the Japanese people and conducted diplomatic negotiations with the Gaya confederacy. On the other hand, the South Korean side claimed that the agency was the diplomatic office of Gaya, which employed the Japanese as bureaucrats of Gaya. The collaboration ended in 2010 with the publication of a final report describing the above. The full text of the minutes concerning the joint research is disclosed by the Japanese side.

Gallery

See also

Japanese clans
Kuni no miyatsuko
Kumaso
BBC Reel: The ancient tombs kept under lock and key, 27 August 2019
Kofun
Kofun system

Notes

References

 
 
 
 
 
 
 
 
 
 
 
 
 Japan

This period is part of the Yamato period of Japanese History.

< Yayoi | History of Japan | Asuka period >

 
Archaeological cultures of East Asia
3rd century in Japan
4th century in Japan
5th century in Japan
6th century in Japan